The 2005 World Archery Championships was the 43rd edition of the event. It was held in Madrid, Spain on 20–26 June 2005 and was organized by World Archery Federation (FITA).

Medals table

Medals summary

Recurve

Compound

References

External links
 World Archery website
 Complete results

 
World Championship
World Archery
International archery competitions hosted by Spain
World Archery Championships